Nour El-Sherif (28 April 1946 – 11 August 2015), born Mohamad Geber Mohamad Abd Allah was a prominent Egyptian actor. He has 6 films in the Top 100 Egyptian films list.

El-Sherif was born in the working-class neighbourhood of Sayeda Zainab in Cairo. El-Sherif was married to Poussi (1972–2006) and together they had two daughters, Sarah and Mai. He got divorced from Poussi in 2006 and they reunited in early 2015 during the difficulty of his illness. He also played soccer before choosing acting as a career. Nour El-Sherif is sometimes credited as Nour El Cherif, Nour El-Cherif or Nour Al-Sharif. He died on August 11, 2015, Cairo, Egypt.

Death
Nour El-Sherif died from lung cancer in Cairo at the age of 69 in 2015 after a severe struggle with the disease.

Tribute
On 28 April 2021, Google celebrated his 75th birthday with a Google Doodle.

Filmography

See also

Top 100 Egyptian films
Salah Zulfikar
Soad Hosny
Ahmed Zaki
List of Egyptians

References
 Habib, Samar. Female Homosexuality in the Middle East: Histories and Representations. Routledge, July 18, 2007. , 9780415956734.

Notes

External links

1946 births
2015 deaths
Egyptian male film actors
Egyptian Muslims
Deaths from cancer in Egypt
Deaths from lung cancer